Nick Drake is an American-only LP compilation release by English folk musician Nick Drake. It was released in August 1971 as SMAS-9307, shortly after Island Records had started selling their own records in the U.S. At the time, they were distributed by Capitol Records.

The album included three songs from Five Leaves Left and five songs from Bryter Layter, and was packaged in a gatefold sleeve that featured photos by Keith Morris.

The fifth edition of the Goldmine Record Album Price Guide places its value at $80.

Universal Island Records released a limited-edition reproduction of the LP on 20 April 2013, as part of Record Store Day 2013.

Critical reception
Reviewing the album for Rolling Stone, Stephen Holden said, "British singer-songwriter Nick Drake's American debut album is a beautiful and decadent record. A triumph of eclecticism, it successfully brings together varied elements characteristic of the evolution of urban folk rock music during the past five years." Holden described the tunes as "derivative" but "melodically strong and harmonically kinetic", and that they were "enhanced by the brilliant arrangements". He highlighted Drake's lyrics as the album's greatest weakness, but concluded that "the beauty of Drake's voice is its own justification. May it become familiar to us all."

Billboard stated, "From the opening tune, "Cello Song", Nick Drake has established his past, present and future, as he blends with the finest taste, the elements of jazz, classical and pop music with a mellow voice which whispers its message and soothes the ears of the listener."

Track listing 
All songs are written by Nick Drake.

Side one
"Cello Song" – 4:48
"Poor Boy" – 6:09
"At the Chime of a City Clock" – 4:45
"Northern Sky" – 3:45

Side two
"River Man" – 4:22
"Three Hours" – 6:15
"One of These Things First" – 4:51
"Fly" – 3:00

Personnel 
Nick Drake – vocals, guitar, piano
Rocky Dzidzornu – percussion
Mike Kowalski – drums
Clare Lowther – cello
Dave Pegg – bass
Danny Thompson – bass
Ed Carter – bass
Chris McGregor – piano
John Cale – piano, celeste, organ, harpsichord, viola
Paul Harris – piano
Ray Warleigh – alto sax
P.P. Arnold and Doris Troy – backing vocals
Robert Kirby – string arrangements
Harry Robinson – string arrangements

Production
Joe Boyd – producer
John Wood – engineer

References

1971 compilation albums
Albums produced by Joe Boyd
Island Records compilation albums
Nick Drake compilation albums